Herbertia is a small genus of herbaceous, perennial and bulbous plants in the family Iridaceae.

Description

Herbaceous and perennial plants, from tunicate, ovoid bulbs with brown, dry, brittle and papery tunics. The stems are simple or branched. The leaves are few, with the basal ones larger than the others; the blade is pleated, linear-lanceolate.

Taxonomy
Herbertia consists of 8 accepted species. One of them is native to southeastern + south-central United States, while the others are distributed in South America. The genus is closely related to Alophia, Cypella, and Tigridia.

The name of the genus is dedicated to William Herbert (1778–1847), a prominent British botanist and specialist in bulbous plants.

 Species
 Herbertia amatorum C.H.Wright - Uruguay
 Herbertia darwinii Roitman & J.A.Castillo - Rio Grande do Sul State in Brazil, Corrientes Province in Argentina
 Herbertia furcata (Klatt) Ravenna - Uruguay, southern Brazil, Misiones Province in Argentina
 Herbertia hauthalii (Kuntze) K.Schum. - Paraguay
 Herbertia lahue (Molina) Goldblatt - southern Brazil, northern Argentina, central Chile, Uruguay, southern United States (Texas, Louisiana, Mississippi, Florida Panhandle)
 Herbertia pulchella Sweet  - Colombia, Venezuela, Bolivia, Uruguay, southern Brazil, northern Chile, Salta Province in Argentina 
 Herbertia quareimana Ravenna - Uruguay, southern Brazil
 Herbertia tigridioides Goldblatt  - Bolivia, northern Argentina
 Herbertia zebrina Deble - Rio Grande do Sul State in Brazil

References

 Goldblatt, P. Flora of North America: Herbertia.
 Peter Goldblatt. Herbertia (Iridaceae) Reinstated as a Valid Generic Name. Annals of the Missouri Botanical Garden, Vol. 64, No. 2 (1977), pp. 378–379

External links
 Imágens from the  PacifiBulb Society

Iridaceae
Iridaceae genera